War of Religion may refer to:

European wars of religion, a series of European wars of the Sixteenth and Seventeenth Centuries
French Wars of Religion, a specific series in the larger conflagration
Crusades, a series of religious wars sanctioned by the Latin Church in the medieval period

See also 
 Crusade (disambiguation)
 Holy War (disambiguation)
 Jihad (disambiguation)
 Sacred War (disambiguation)
 Religious conflict (disambiguation)